The 1999 Riley Premier League was a  professional non-ranking snooker tournament that was played from 2 January to 16 May 1999.

John Higgins won in the final 9–4 against Jimmy White.


League phase

Top four qualified for the play-offs. If points were level then most frames won determined their positions. If two players had an identical record then the result in their match determined their positions. If that ended 4–4 then the player who got to four first was higher.

 Match Day 1 – Torbay Leisure Centre, Paignton
  Jimmy White 4–4 Ken Doherty
  Ronnie O'Sullivan 4–4 Mark Williams
 Match Day 2 – Torbay Leisure Centre, Paignton
 Mark Williams 5–3 Steve Davis
 Stephen Hendry 5–3 John Higgins
 Jimmy White 4–4 Ronnie O'Sullivan
 Match Day 3 – Barrow (9 January 1999)
 John Higgins 4–4 Mark Williams
 Ronnie O'Sullivan 6–2 Ken Doherty
 Match Day 4 – Barrow (10 January 1999)
 Mark Williams 5–3 Ken Doherty
 Stephen Hendry 6–2 Steve Davis
 Match Day 5
 John Higgins 6–2 Steve Davis
 Ronnie O'Sullivan 6–2 Stephen Hendry
 Match Day 6 – Lincoln (7 February 1999)
 Jimmy White 5–3 Stephen Hendry
 Ronnie O'Sullivan 6–2 Steve Davis
 John Higgins 6–2 Ken Doherty
 Match Day 7 – Lincoln (7 February 1999)
 Jimmy White 4–4 John Higgins
 Ken Doherty 6–2 Stephen Hendry
 Match Day 8  
 Mark Williams 5–3 Jimmy White
 Steve Davis 4–4 Ken Doherty
 Ronnie O'Sullivan 5–3 John Higgins
 Match Day 9
 Mark Williams 5–3 Stephen Hendry
 Steve Davis 5–3 Jimmy White

Play-offs 
15–16 May – Magnet Leisure Centre, Maidenhead, England

References

Premier League Snooker
1999 in snooker
1999 in British sport